Jade Annmarie Lorton-Radburn (born 21 February 1989) is an English footballer who plays as a defender or midfielder for Keynsham Town.

Club career
Lorton-Radburn joined Leicester City Women at under-10 level and later spent three years with the first team, before joining Blackburn Rovers Ladies in the 2009 close season after a successful trial.

She moved to OOH Lincoln Ladies in November 2009. Lorton-Radburn greatly impressed Lincoln manager Rod Wilson with her performances, both at centre-half and in midfield.

In October 2010 Radburn signed for Keynsham Town. She was then revealed as part of Bristol Academy's FA WSL squad in March 2011. Lorton-Radburn made her WSL debut in a 0–0 draw at Everton, but was ineligible for Bristol's FA Women's Cup final defeat to Arsenal after playing for Keynsham in an earlier round of the competition. She was named in Bristol Academy's 2011–12 UEFA Women's Champions League squad in September 2011. In March 2012 it was reported that Lorton-Radburn had rejoined Leicester City.

She signed for Doncaster Rovers Belles in July 2015, after leaving Yeovil Town Ladies and the end of the previous season. Promotion-chasing Belles manager Glen Harris praised Lorton-Radburn's "strength and power". She scored a goal on her debut for the club, a header in a 5–0 win over Watford.

International career
Lorton-Radburn represented Great Britain at the World University Games, playing in the 2009 tournament in Belgrade and winning a bronze medal.

Personal life
Lorton-Radburn attended Loughborough University. In July 2013 Radburn married Yeovil teammate Justine Lorton.

Blackburn Rovers statistics

References

External links
 

1989 births
Living people
Footballers from Leicester
English women's footballers
Notts County L.F.C. players
Bristol Academy W.F.C. players
Blackburn Rovers L.F.C. players
Yeovil Town L.F.C. players
FA Women's National League players
Alumni of Loughborough University
Women's Super League players
English LGBT sportspeople
Lesbian sportswomen
LGBT association football players
Doncaster Rovers Belles L.F.C. players
Leicester City W.F.C. players
Women's association football central defenders
Women's association football midfielders
Keynsham Town L.F.C. players
Universiade bronze medalists for Great Britain
Universiade medalists in football